Rockstar Mentality is the only album by the Shop Boyz, released on June 19, 2007. It debuted #11 on the Billboard 200 with 52,000 copies sold in the U.S. in its first week, and sold a total of 212,000 copies.

The record was a critical and commercial disappointment, receiving 2/5 ratings from both Allmusic and Rolling Stone. While the leadoff single, "Party Like a Rockstar," peaked at #2 on the Billboard Hot 100, the follow-up single, "They Like Me," tanked at #98.

Track listing

iTunes Exclusive Track

Chart positions

Weekly charts

Year-end charts

References

2007 debut albums
Albums produced by David Banner
Universal Records albums
Shop Boyz albums